The 2021–22 Montana State Bobcats women's basketball team represented Montana State University during the 2021–22 NCAA Division I women's basketball season. The Bobcats, led by seventeenth year head coach Tricia Binford, played their home games at Brick Breeden Fieldhouse and were members of the Big Sky Conference. 

They finished the season 22–13, 14–6 in Big Sky play to finish in a tie for second place. As the second seed in the Big Sky tournament, the earned a bye into the Quarterfinals where they defeated Weber State.  They then defeated Idaho in the Semifinals and Northern Arizona in the Finals to win the tournament for the third time in team history.  They received an automatic bid to the NCAA tournament and were the sixteen seed in the Spokane Regional. They were defeated in the First Round by one seed Stanford to end their season.

Previous season  

The Bobcats finished the season 17–7, 13–3 in Big Sky play to finish in third place. As the third seed in the Big Sky tournament, the earned a bye into the Quarterfinals where they defeated Sacramento State before losing to Idaho in the Semifinals.  They were not invited to the NCAA tournament or the WNIT.

Roster

Schedule

Source:

|-
!colspan=6 style=| Exhibition

|-
!colspan=6 style=| Regular Season

|-
!colspan=6 style=| Big Sky tournament

|-
!colspan=6 style=| NCAA tournament

Rankings

The Coaches Poll did not release a Week 2 poll and the AP Poll did not release a poll after the NCAA Tournament.

References

Montana State Bobcats women's basketball seasons
Montana State
Montana State, basketball women
Montana State, basketball women
Montana State